Arcumeggia (Arcümégia in local dialect) is a fraction of the municipality of Casalzuigno in the province of Varese, in Italy.

Overview
The place is known because in 1956 the Organization Provincial for the Tourism decided to turn it into a painted village. After such decision, came in the country artists as Ferruccio Ferrazzi, Aldo Carpi, Sante Monachesi, Aligi Sassu, Ernesto Treccani, Achille Funi, Giuseppe Migneco, Gianni Dova, Gianfilippo Usellini, Innocente Salvini, Giovanni Brancaccio, Bruno Saetti, Enzo Morelli, Remo Brindisi, Fiorenzo Tomea, Eugenio Tomiolo, Francesco Menzio, Ilario Rossi, Giuseppe Montanari, Cristoforo De Amicis, Luigi Montanarini, Umberto Faini, Antonio Pedretti and Albino Reggiori.
The paintings, performed with the technique of the fresco, are on the external walls of the houses of the village:

 Giovanni Brancaccio: "Girl at the window", 1956
 Remo Brindisi: "Inhabitants and jobs of the place", 1957
 Aldo Carpi: "Sant'Ambrogio blesses Arcumeggia", 1966, "Divine Lamb" (ceramics), 1967
 Cristoforo de Amicis "Madonna and angel", 1958
 Gianni Dova: "The bullfight", 1964
 Umberto Faini: "Allegory of the mural decoration", 1994
 Ferruccio Ferrazzi: "Waiting", 1956
 Achille Funi: "Madonnina", 1956
 Giuseppe Migneco: "The emigrant's departure", 1962
 Francesco Menzio: "Children among the trees", 1956
 Sante Monachesi: "Gea’s triumph", 1959
 Giuseppe Montanari: "St. Martin and the poor man", 1956
 Luigi Montanarini: "Composition", 1959
 Enzo Morelli: "The Samaritane at the well", 1956
 Antonio Pedretti: "In the Alps, heart of Europe, the roots of the European union", 2001
 Bruno Saetti: "Maternity", 1956
 Innocente Salvini: "The division of the polenta in family", 1971
 Aligi Sassu: "Racing cyclists", 1967 and "St. Martin", 1991
 Fiorenzo Tomea: "The Crucified", 1956
 Eugenio Tomiolo: "Hope", 1956
 Ernesto Treccani: "Rural composition", 1974
 Gianfilippo Usellini: "The emigrant's return", 1956, "Sant'Antonio ",1967, "St. Rocco", 1967 and "Severin, drik little wine!!!", 1964.

Close to the church, there is a Way of the Cross, with the stations painted  by 11 different artists:

 I - Giuseppe Montanari: Jesus is condemned to death, 1963
 II - Sante Monachesi: Jesus is given his cross, 1959
 III - Aldo Carpi: Jesus falls the first time, 1963
 IV - Remo Brindisi: Jesus meets Maria, 1960
 V - Enzo Morelli: Jesus helped by Symone of Cirene, 1963
 VI - Ilario Rossi: Veronica wipes the face of Jesus, 1960
 VII - Luigi Montanarini: Jesus falls the second time, 1959
 VIII – Giuseppe Montanari: Jesus meets the pious women, within 1960
 IX - Gianfilippo Usellini: Jesus falls the third time, after April 1960
 X - Giovanni Brancaccio: Jesus stripped of the dresses, 1961
 XI - Aligi Sassu: Jesus is nailed to the cross, 1963 (?)
 XII - Aldo Carpi: Jesus dies on the cross, 1963
 XIII - Gianfilippo Usellini: Jesus' body is removed from the cross, 1963
 XIV - Eugenio Tomiolo: Jesus is laid in the sepulchre, 1965

Notable it is also the House of the Painter that preserves the sketches and the tests of the frescos and hosts summer courses of painting  organized by the Academy of Fine Arts of Brera.

Arcumeggia is the native country of the sculptor Giuseppe Vittorio Cerini (1862–1935), of which numerous works are in Italy (Turin, Bra, Ceva, St. Benign Canavese, Virle and in the Varesotto) and in some foreign countries (Switzerland and Argentina). May be admired a small gallery of plaster casts in the courtyard of the native house  and two marble works in the local cemetery.

Bibliography 

 Arcumeggia, la galleria all'aperto dell'affresco. Edizione "Pro Arcumeggia" presso l'Ente Provinciale Turismo - Varese, 1985
 Giuseppe Cerini di Arcumeggia - Lavoro di ricerca della libera associazione culturale "La corte dei Sofistici", 1999
 Carlo Torriani: "Sui muri di Arcumeggia nuovo splendore per gli affreschi di Funi, Brindisi, Dova" - Corriere della sera del 27-7-1984
 Aristide Selmi: "Se dovete andare in piazza Dova prendete via Tomea e poi via Sassu" - Domenica del Corriere dell'11-9-1975
 Angelo Montonati: "Arcumeggia, il paese grandi firme" - Famiglia Cristiana n. 38, 1995
 Meridiani - Laghi lombardi - Anno XVII n. 127
 Arcumeggia - La galleria all'aperto dell'affresco a cura di Alberto Bertoni e Raffaella Ganna, Macchione Editore, 1997

External links 

 http://www.pbase.com/alymd/arcumeggia (photos of the frescos of Arcumeggia)
 http://www.eugeniotomiolo.it/notizia/arcumeggia/arcumeggia_completo.php
 http://www.opificiodellepietredure.it/index.php?it/297/pitture-murali-di-arcumeggia-va
 http://www.settemuse.it/viaggi_italia_lombardia/varese_arcumeggia.htm
 http://www.vareselandoftourism.it/?lang=it&pers=localita&focus=0240&PAG=arcumeggia-it

Frazioni of the Province of Varese
Former municipalities of Lombardy